Mary Newcomb (25 January 1922 – 29 March 2008) was a British artist.

She was born Mary Slatford at Harrow-on-the-Hill on 25 January 1922. She studied Natural Sciences at Reading University.

Her work is in the permanent collection of the Tate Gallery.

References

British artists
1922 births
2008 deaths
Norwich Twenty Group